The Carracks (meaning rocks) and Little Carracks (meaning rock of the birds) are a group of small rocky inshore islands off the Atlantic north coast of west Cornwall, England, United Kingdom. The name comes from "carrek", the Cornish language word for 'rock'. The Little Carracks were still known as Carrack an Heythen c. 1920. The islands are in Zennor civil parish.

The largest island in the group is sometimes referred to as Seal Island and is home to Atlantic grey seals, dogfish, anglerfish and sea anemones.

Boats from St Ives often travel to and from the islands to give visitors the chance to observe the seals and other wildlife on the island.

While being towed, it sank off The Carracks and remains there at present as a diving attraction.

References

Uninhabited islands of Cornwall
Tourist attractions in Cornwall
Zennor